Lost to Apathy is the fifth EP by Swedish melodic death metal band Dark Tranquillity. It was released on 15 November 2004 through Century Media Records. All songs were recorded from the Character album, except the live version of "Undo Control" which is from the previously released Live Damage DVD. The album also includes the video for "Lost to Apathy", produced by Roger Johansson (who worked with other bands such as The Haunted, In Flames, and HammerFall) and a Dark Tranquillity screensaver.

"Lost to Apathy" is on the Alone in the Dark (see Page) soundtrack. "Derivation TNB" is a joint remix of some clean riffs from "The New Build", "Mind Matters" and "Dry Run", songs from Character. A shorter version (only the "New Build" riff) can be found at the end of "Through Smudged Lenses", also in the Character album. The EP also includes an industrial remix of "The Endless Feed".

Track listing

Multimedia enhancements

Credits
Dark Tranquillity
 Mikael Stanne − vocals
 Martin Henriksson − Guitar
 Niklas Sundin − Guitar
 Michael Nicklasson − Bass guitar
 Martin Brändström − keyboards and electronics
 Anders Jivarp − drums

Guests
 All tracks mastered by Peter In de Betou at Tailor maid
 Artwork design by Cabin Fever Media

References

External links
 Lost to Apathy at Dark Tranquillity's official site

Dark Tranquillity albums
2004 EPs
Century Media Records EPs